The Institute of Civil Funerals (IoCF) is a not-for-profit, professional member organization that sets, regulates and maintains the national standard and quality of Civil Funerals in the UK and provides ongoing professional support and development for its members.

History of the IoCF
The Institute was established as a result of the initial directive given in The Registration Review White Paper published in January 2002 entitled Civil Registration: Vital Change  Chapter 4, New Services, and the need to drive upwards the quality of funeral ceremonies in the UK by furthering the provision of Civil Funerals and supporting the work of Civil Funeral Celebrants.

April 2002 saw the launch of the then new Civil Funeral ceremony being offered for the first time in England, this was in response to a recognised widening gap between the changing needs of society and the range of funeral ceremonies available.

Aims and objectives of the IoCF
The IoCF is the only UK celebrant organisation with Institute status and, as such, it works to ensure the most rigorous professional support for bereaved families from its members. 

Membership is open only to celebrants who have achieved the highest accredited qualification for funeral celebrants, the Level 3 Diploma in Funeral Celebrancy. Members undergo annual assessment from other professionals in the funeral sector and complete an annual requirement of Continuing Professional Development (CPD).

As well as offering choice, a key objective of the IoCF is to identify those spheres where there are particularly traumatic or difficult circumstances surrounding a funeral that call for specialist knowledge, such as ceremonies involving retained organs, stillbirth or pre-term babies, suicides and homicide victims.

Definition of a Civil Funeral
The IoCF defines the Civil Funeral as "A funeral which is driven by the wishes, beliefs and values of the deceased and their family, not by the beliefs or ideology of the person conducting the funeral". This means that members of the Institute, known in a professional capacity as Civil Funeral Celebrants, conduct non-religious funeral ceremonies as well as funeral ceremonies including religious material, if this is a preference expressed by the deceased or the bereaved.

The Civil Funeral Ceremony is designed and conducted in such a way as to reflect the express wishes of the deceased and that of the family.

Civil Funeral Celebrants
Civil Funeral Celebrants lead the funeral ceremony and work in consultation with the family and the Funeral Director.

The Institute's Council of Management views quality of performance by is celebrants as key and in recognition of this, Celebrants adhere to the Institute's Code of Practice and are assessed annually to retain their membership.

A support structure exists to support and advise members with particularly sensitive funerals.

References

External links
 Institute of Civil Funerals website

Funeral-related industry